Bodies, Rest & Motion is a 1993 American drama film written by Roger Hedden based on his 1986 play, and directed by Michael Steinberg.  The film stars Phoebe Cates, Bridget Fonda, Tim Roth, and Eric Stoltz: they play four friends who are interested in the relationships they have and changing their own lives, but along the way their interests in life and each other start to change. The film also takes place at small gas stations in the Arizona desert, and Bridget Fonda's real life father, Peter Fonda, has a Cameo appearance as motorcycle rider. Bodies, Rest & Motion premiered at the 1993 Sundance Film Festival and was screened in the Un Certain Regard section at the 1993 Cannes Film Festival.

Cast
 Phoebe Cates as Carol
 Bridget Fonda as Beth
 Tim Roth as Nick
 Eric Stoltz as Sid
 Alicia Witt as Elizabeth
 Sandra Lafferty as Yard Sale Lady
 Sidney Dawson as TV Customer
 Jon Proudstar as Station Attendant
 Scott Johnson as Chip
 Kezbah Weidner as Dine Woman
 Peter Fonda as Motorcycle Rider
 Amaryllis Borrego as Waitress
 Rich Wheeler as Elizabeth's Grandfather
 Scott Frederick as TV Store Kid
 Warren Burton as Radio Preacher (voice)

Original stage version
Hedden wrote the script based on his own play, which premiered off-Broadway on December 21, 1986, at the Mitzi E. Newhouse Theater, with William H. Macy as Nick, Christina Moore as Carol, Laurie Metcalf as Beth, and Andrew McCarthy as Sid. According to Frank Rich, the play's "meager plot—an arbitrary coupling or two, followed by equally whimsical leave-takings and reunions—leads to nothing more than a sentimental final-curtain reaffirmation of the transforming powers of true love." The original run lasted 22 performances.

Reception
Janet Maslin called the characters played by the four central actors "quirky, magnetic", saying they are set against the backdrop of a "bland, artificial culture winning its war with nature"; the film is "much too studiedly hip to indulge in a happy ending, but in its wry, offbeat way it does inch forward. In this jaded context, a small step in the right direction is indeed a large step for mankind."  According to People, the film "wants desperately to say something profound about the condition of twentysomethings. But it succeeds only in sounding like outtakes from an undergrad bull session. While Fonda and Cates manage to keep their footing, Roth elicits no emotion beyond irritation, and Stoltz acts as if he's had his nose in the latex too long." Roger Ebert gave the film two stars out of four, saying it is "one of those movies that not only comes accompanied by supporting materials, but seems fairly pointless unless you brief yourself"; according to Ebert, if the viewer knows Newton's first law of motion and keeps in mind that "'Generation X' is a media buzzword for the late-twentysomethings [who have been] so named, apparently, for their lack of an identity", it is "possible to watch Bodies, Rest and Motion, and find that it makes a statement about its generation. Without the cheat sheet, you'd more likely say the movie is about a bunch of aimless, boring, hopeless drips, who inspire neither sympathy nor interest. If I were a doctor, I'd suspect Lyme disease." 

On Rotten Tomatoes, Bodies, Rest & Motion has an approval rating of 53% based on 30 reviews.

Home video
The film received a laserdisc release from the Criterion Collection in 1993. In December 2020, the film received a Blu-ray release from Kino Lorber.

References

External links
 
 
 

1993 films
1993 drama films
1993 independent films
1990s English-language films
American drama films
American films based on plays
Films directed by Michael Steinberg
Films scored by Michael Convertino
1990s American films